Darrehrud-e Shomali is in Darrehrud District of Ungut County, Ardabil province, Iran. The constituent parts of the rural district were in the former Angut District of Germi County before the formation of Ungut County.  It is one of two rural districts in the district, and there are no cities. The center of the rural district is the village of Aqa Mohammad Beyglu, whose population in 2016 was 803 in 182 households.

References 

Rural Districts of Ardabil Province

Populated places in Ardabil Province

fa:دهستان دره‌رود شمالی